Randy Navarrete Espinosa (born 22 August 1988) is a Guamanian international footballer.

Career
Espinosa played for the Guam U-18 team, before joined to Seattle Redhawks. In 2009 signed for Guam United Soccer Club.

International
He made his first appearance for the Guam national football team in 2006.

References

1988 births
Guamanian footballers
Living people
Guam international footballers
Association football forwards
Seattle Redhawks men's soccer players